Mill Bay may refer to:

 Mill Bay, Alaska, United States
 Mill Bay, British Columbia, Canada
 Mill Bay, Northern Ireland
 Millbay, Plymouth, England
 Nanjizal, Cornwall, England
  a ferry in British Columbia